The canton of Clermont-l'Hérault is an administrative division of the Hérault department, southern France. Its borders were modified at the French canton reorganisation which came into effect in March 2015. Its seat is in Clermont-l'Hérault.

Composition 

It consists of the following communes:

Les Aires
Aspiran
Avène
Bédarieux
Le Bousquet-d'Orb
Brenas
Brignac
Camplong
Canet
Carlencas-et-Levas
Ceilhes-et-Rocozels
Ceyras
Clermont-l'Hérault
Combes
Dio-et-Valquières
Graissessac
Hérépian
Joncels
Lacoste
Lamalou-les-Bains
Liausson
Lunas
Mérifons
Mourèze
Nébian
Octon
Paulhan
Pézènes-les-Mines
Le Poujol-sur-Orb
Le Pradal
Saint-Étienne-Estréchoux
Saint-Félix-de-Lodez
Saint-Geniès-de-Varensal
Saint-Gervais-sur-Mare
Salasc
Taussac-la-Billière
La Tour-sur-Orb
Valmascle
Villemagne-l'Argentière
Villeneuvette

Councillors

Pictures of the canton

References 

Cantons of Hérault